Howard Miller may refer to:

 Howard Miller (minister) (1894–1948), minister and general superintendent in the Church of the Nazarene
 Howard Shultz Miller (1879–1970), U.S. Representative from Kansas
 Howard Lee Miller (1888-1977), member of the Mississippi House of Representatives
 Howard Miller Clock Company
 J. Howard Miller, the artist who made the We Can Do It! poster